Paul Demange (4 June 1906 – 18 April 1970) was a Minister of State for Monaco. He served between 1966 and 1969. He was born in 1906 and died in 1970.

References

Ministers of State of Monaco
1906 births
1970 deaths
Monegasque politicians